Jeremy Wells (born 7 June 1977) is a New Zealand media personality who hosts the Radio Hauraki breakfast show with Matt Heath, Seven Sharp alongside Hilary Barry, and the NZ version of Taskmaster.

Career 
Wells first appeared on television in 1997 on MTV. He later appeared as Newsboy on Mikey Havoc's television show. Wells and Havoc went their separate ways when the show finished - Havoc fronting a show on TV3 and Wells hosting Eating Media Lunch on TVNZ. He also presented the satirical The Unauthorised History Of New Zealand in 2005 and an episode of Intrepid Journeys in 2007. The New Zealand Listener described Wells' deadpan delivery as "newsnight-of-the-living-dead", saying he would be "compelling viewing reading the phone book."

Wells became notorious in November 2003 when an episode of Eating Media Lunch spoofed the current affairs programme Target, which often used hidden cameras to catch unreliable tradepersons or workers. The spoof depicted two actors as Target camera technicians in someone else's home, caught on hidden camera in acts such as masturbation, defecation (on a kitchen stove), drug use and phone sex. One technician stripped naked, covered himself with cling wrap, and appeared to urinate on the other technician. Several viewers complained but, in March 2004, the BSA (Broadcasting Standards Authority) of New Zealand found the episode had not breached any guidelines.

Wells and Havoc satirically labelled Gore the gay capital of New Zealand in 1999, during Havoc and Newsboy's Sell-out Tour. Returning to  town to cover the 2008 election, Wells was confronted by 15 men angry over the comments. The group started harassing him at a petrol station, and followed him back to his hotel room. They harassed him for 90 minutes and he was trapped in his hotel room until the police were called. Gore District Mayor Tracy Hicks said Wells was "either very brave or very stupid" for coming back. 

Wells spent 23 days travelling with the 108 members of the NZSO in October 2010 and produced a documentary The Grand Tour, a product of his own interest in classical music. The programme contains several interviews with the musicians and support crew, including Dame Kiri Te Kanawa.

Wells co-hosted The Saturday Special with Steve Simpson on bFM; the show continued when both hosts moved to Radio Hauraki. In 2014, Wells changed shows to become a co-host of the Radio Hauraki breakfast show, alongside Matt Heath and Laura McGoldrick.

Since 2018, he has co-hosted TVNZ's Seven Sharp with Hilary Barry, and from 2020 he is the host of the New Zealand version of the TV series Taskmaster.

In November 2020 he was named one of the best dressed men in show business on David Hartnell MNZM's Best Dressed List.

Personal life 
Wells was born in Auckland, New Zealand, the son of sports administrators Sir John Wells and Sheryl, Lady Wells. He was expelled from the exclusive Wanganui Collegiate School in his sixth-form year for giving marijuana oil to a recovering drug addict, and later attended St Paul's Collegiate in Hamilton. In 2005, Wells was awarded a Bravo award by the New Zealand Skeptics for his "scathing look at the psychic and medium business, on Eating Media Lunch".

See also
 List of New Zealand television personalities

References

External links
 
 Jeremy Wells on Intrepid Journeys (TVNZ website)

Living people
1977 births
New Zealand radio presenters
New Zealand television presenters
New Zealand comedians
New Zealand male comedians
New Zealand satirists
People educated at Whanganui Collegiate School
Radio Hauraki
People educated at St Paul's Collegiate School